Robert Darène (10 January 1914 – 15 January 2016) was a French actor, film director and screenwriter. He appeared in twelve films between 1934 and 1959, and directed nine films between 1951 and 1963.

Selected filmography
 Le Chevalier de la nuit (1953)
 Goubbiah, mon amour (1956)
  The Amorous Corporal (1958)
 The Cage (1963)

See also
 List of centenarians (actors, filmmakers and entertainers)

References

External links

1914 births
2016 deaths
French male film actors
French film directors
French male screenwriters
French screenwriters
French centenarians
Men centenarians
20th-century French male actors